Dame Asha Khemka  (born October 1951, in Sitamarhi, Bihar) is a former British educator who resigned as Principal and CEO from West Nottinghamshire College in late 2018 when the college experienced financial difficulties. She joined the college in 2006, succeeding Di McEvoy-Robinson. Prior to her resignation in October 2018 she was one of the highest paid in the sector.

Honours
She was awarded the OBE (Order of the British Empire) in 2008. In 2014, she was elevated to Dame Commander of the Order of the British Empire. She is the fourth woman of Indian origin to be awarded a damehood of the Order of the British Empire (DBE or GBE) since the orders were instituted in 1917, following, chronologically, Kaikhusrau Jahan, Begum of Bhopal (1917), Maharani Lakshmi Devi Bai Sahiba of Dhar State (1931), and Indira Patel (2011).

In 2017, she was appointed Deputy Lieutenant of Staffordshire, where she is a long-term resident. In April 2017, she was named Asian Businesswoman of the Year at a ceremony in Birmingham.

Other awards
 National Jewel Award for Excellence in Healthcare and Education, 2007 
 Asian Women of Achievement Award, 2008 
 Midlands Businesswoman of the Year, 2009 
 NRI Welfare Society of India Gold medal for her work in education as a non-resident Indian, 2010 
 Inspirational Woman of the Year, Derbyshire and Nottinghamshire Chamber of Commerce, 2011 
 Business Personality of the Year, Ashfield and Mansfield Chad, 2011
 Overall Commitment to Apprenticeships (inaugural Asian Apprenticeship Awards, black and minority ethnic Asian community).

Charity
Khemka was the founder of the Inspire and Achieve Foundation, a mentoring organisation intended "...to help troubled, neglected and disadvantaged young people aged 16 to 26...", sometimes known as NEETS – Not in Employment, Education or Training.

Personal life
Khemka is married to Shankar Lal Khemka, a trauma and orthopaedic surgeon. They have three children. She left education in the Bihar area of India at the age 13 and was married at 15. She travelled with her husband to live in the UK during 1978, where she first learned English by watching television and speaking to local people. After being a housewife for 20 years, she returned to education as a mature student, achieving a degree at Cardiff University, then secured her first career-step as a college business studies tutor.

Controversy and resignation
Khemka resigned on 1 October 2018, with 'immediate effect', following a special Board of Governors meeting. The college experienced serious financial irregularities throughout 2018 and prior, and has been placed in 'special measures', having been handed a "Notice To Improve" during July, 2018.

Prior to her resignation, Khemka was one of the highest paid principals/CEOs in the sector, with £275K in 2015/16 and £262K in 2016/17. In early 2019, Khemka was reported to have claimed in excess of £41K expenses over a three-year period. FE Week reported that Khemka resigned without accepting a financial payout amounting to £130K.

References

1951 births
Living people
British educators
Indian emigrants to England
Dames Commander of the Order of the British Empire
Deputy Lieutenants of Staffordshire
Date of birth missing (living people)
Place of birth missing (living people)
Naturalised citizens of the United Kingdom
Indian dames